Walter Bigg (1606 – 5 August 1659) was an English merchant and politician who sat in the House of Commons  in 1659.

Bigg was the son of Walter Bigg Senior of Wallingford in Berkshire and Crowmarsh Gifford in Oxfordshire. He lived in the parish of St Giles in the Fields and was a citizen of London and a member of the Worshipful Company of Merchant Taylors. On 6 September 1653 he was elected alderman of the City of London for Castle Baynard ward. He was Sheriff of London in 1654 and Master of the Merchant Taylors for 1654 to 1655. In 1657 he became alderman for Cripplegate ward.

In 1659, Bigg was elected Member of Parliament for Wallingford in the Third Protectorate Parliament. He was the founder of Wallingford School.

His son, John Bigg, was MP for Huntingdon in 1689.

References

1606 births
1659 deaths
English MPs 1659
People from Wallingford, Oxfordshire
Founders of English schools and colleges
People from Holborn
17th-century merchants
Merchants from London
Politicians from London
17th-century English businesspeople
17th-century philanthropists